"Promises" is a dance-pop song by British boy band Take That. Written by Gary Barlow and Graham Stack, it was released on 11 November 1991 as the second single from the band's debut album, Take That & Party (1992). It was his first single released after signing to RCA Records. It was a modest success, charting at number 38 on the UK Singles Chart.

Critical reception
Alan Jones from Music Week described the track as a "well-performed, hook-laden pop song executed with more panache and credibility than most teen favourites can conjure up. This is definitely one to watch." Simon Williams from NME said, "The synth-mungous likes of 'Once You've Tasted Love' and 'Promises' are amiably crass hi-NRG rompalongs, sort of Kajagoogoo gone Italian House."

Music video
The music video for the song uses intercut clips of the band performing and rehearsing as well as showing the hysteria of Take That's fans. It also shows a half-naked band member, unknown at the time, jumping out of a swimming pool. Robbie Williams said that person was him during an interview for the 2006 documentary Take That: For the Record. In August 2018 on an Instagram post, Howard Donald revealed that it was he in that shot.

Track listings

 Austrian CD single (PC45085)
 "Promises" (7-inch radio mix) – 3:33
 "Promises" (12-inch mix) – 6:50
 "Do What U Like" – 3:06

 UK 7-inch vinyl (PB45085)
 "Promises" (7-inch radio mix) – 3:33
 "Do What U Like" – 3:06

 UK 7-inch vinyl (PB45085P) (Limited Edition w/poster sleeve)
 "Promises" (7-inch radio mix) – 3:33
 "Do What U Like" – 3:06

 UK cassette (PK45085)
 "Promises" (7-inch radio mix) – 3:33
 "Do What U Like" – 3:06

 UK 12-inch vinyl (PT45086)
 "Promises" (12-inch mix) – 6:50
 "Do What U Like" (12-inch mix) – 5:06

Personnel
 Gary Barlow – lead vocals
 Howard Donald – backing vocals
 Jason Orange – backing vocals
 Mark Owen – backing vocals
 Robbie Williams – backing vocals

Charts

References

1991 singles
Take That songs
Songs written by Gary Barlow
Songs written by Graham Stack (record producer)
1991 songs
RCA Records singles